Sylwia Nowak-Trębacka (born 28 April 1976) is a Polish ice dancing coach and former competitor. With partner Sebastian Kolasiński, she is the 1998 Skate Canada International bronze medalist, 1999 Cup of Russia bronze medalist, 1994 World Junior champion, and a nine-time Polish national champion.

Personal life 
Sylwia Nowak was born on 28 April 1976 in Łódź, Poland. She married Polish ice dancer Marcin Trębacki in 2003 and changed her surname to Nowak-Trębacka. She and her husband have a son, Maksymilian, and a daughter, Sonia.

Career 
Early in her career, Nowak competed with Rafał Gabinowski. In 1991, coaches paired her with Sebastian Kolasiński, with whom she competed for the rest of her career. They won silver at the 1993 World Junior Championships and then gold in 1994.

As seniors, Nowak/Kolasiński won gold medals at the Nebelhorn Trophy, Finlandia Trophy, and Karl Schäfer Memorial and bronze medals at two Grand Prix competitions, Skate Canada International and Cup of Russia. They placed as high as 9th at the World Championships and competed at two Olympics, in 1998 and 2002. The two retired from competitive skating after the 2002–03 season.

Nowak-Trębacka works as a coach in Toruń. Her most notable students are Natalia Kaliszek / Maksym Spodyriev.

Programs 
(with Kolasiński)

Results
GP: Champions Series/Grand Prix

(with Kolasiński)

References

External links
 

1976 births
Living people
Polish female ice dancers
Polish figure skating coaches
Figure skaters at the 1998 Winter Olympics
Figure skaters at the 2002 Winter Olympics
Olympic figure skaters of Poland
International Skating Union technical specialists
Sportspeople from Łódź
World Junior Figure Skating Championships medalists
Female sports coaches
Universiade medalists in figure skating
Universiade silver medalists for Poland
Competitors at the 2001 Winter Universiade